The Mitsuoka Viewt is a series of retro-styled subcompact cars sold by the Japanese automaker Mitsuoka, intended to resemble the 1963 Jaguar Mark 2. It was initially a modification of the Nissan March/Micra until 2023. The Viewt Story which was introduced in February 2023 is based on the Toyota Yaris (XP210) hatchback. The line was launched in January 1993 and over the course of its production over 12,000 have been sold. It, along with Mitsuoka's later Galue, encouraged larger Japanese manufacturers to produce retro-styled versions of their own cars.

K11 Viewt (1993–2003) 
The first Viewt, introduced in January 1993, was produced on the basis of the K11 March. The March's hatchback was replaced by a fixed rear window and rounded boot, and the front grille and headlamp assembly was replaced by one closely resembling that of the Jaguar Mark II. In standard form the interior was much the same as the March's, but leather seats and wood trim could be added at extra cost.

The Viewt shared its 1.0- and 1.3-litre engines with the March. It was originally available with manual or automatic transmissions; later more luxurious editions were automatic-only.

Changes to the March were usually echoed in the Viewt; for example, when the March received a new dashboard the Viewt had it too, with a new wood kit. After the March convertible was introduced in 1997, Mitsuoka developed a Viewt convertible which used the Jaguar-style front but had a unique built-out rear.

K12 Viewt (2005–2012) 
When the March was updated (becoming the K12) Mitsuoka produced a new Viewt, which first appeared in September 2005. The changes in the style of the March are evident to some extent in the new Viewt: for example, the shape of the rear door has changed and the cabin appears rounder. However, Mitsuoka have persisted with their Jaguar-style front and rear. The only two-door version is the 12SR, which is based on the March 12SR.

Like the March, the new Viewt is available with 1.2-, 1.4- and 1.5-litre engines, with automatic or manual transmissions. The interior resembles the March's; leather seats are optionally available. The 12SR version uses some of the March 12SR's interior decoration, such as carbon fibre inserts on the dashboard.

K13 Viewt (2012–2023) 
The third generation Viewt was based on the K13 March and was first appeared in May 2012. The hatchback version called Viewt Nadeshiko with tailgate and tail lamps taken from the Nissan March was first appeared in July 2015.

XP210 Viewt Story (2023–present) 
The Viewt Story is based on the Toyota Yaris (XP210) hatchback and was introduced on 17 February 2023. It is scheduled to be announced and released in the fall of 2023. The model lineup includes 1.5-liter gasoline vehicles "15LX" and "15DX", 1.0-liter gasoline vehicles "10LX" and "10DX", and 1.5-liter hybrid vehicles "HYBRID LX" and "HYBRID DX". In addition, a 6-speed MT is available for the 1.5-liter model, and a 4WD model (E-four for the hybrid) is available for the 1.5-liter and hybrid models.

External links

Official Mitsuoka Global page
Mitsuoka Viewt

References 
Mitsuoka vehicles
Retro-style automobiles

Cars introduced in 1993
2000s cars
2010s cars